Rubondo Airstrip (TCAA designation: TZ-0023) is an airstrip serving Rubondo Island National Park in the Geita Region of northern Tanzania. The mostly uninhabited game reserve island is in the southwestern tip of Lake Victoria.

Airlines and destinations

See also

List of airports in Tanzania
Transport in Tanzania

References

External links
OpenStreetMap - Rubondo
OurAirports - Rubondo

Airstrips in Tanzania
Buildings and structures in the Mwanza Region